The Wajinden refers to the passages in the 30th volume of the Chinese history chronicle Records of the Three Kingdoms that talk about the Wa people who would later be known as the Japanese people. It describes the mores, geography, and other aspects of the Wa, the people and inhabitants of the Japanese archipelago at the time. The Records of the Three Kingdoms was written by Chen Shou of the Western Jin Dynasty at the end of the 3rd century (between 280 (Demise of Wu) and 297, the year of Chen Shou's death).

Overview 
There was no independent biography called "Wajinden" in  "records of the three kingdoms".、and the description of Yamato is part of the "Biography of Wei", vol. 30, "Biography of Wushan Sunbei Dongbi". Therefore, some believe that it is meaningless unless one reads not only the article on the Yamato but also the whole of the Biography of the Eastern Yi.. Yoshihiro Watanabe, a researcher of "Records of the Three Kingdoms," states that, like the "Book of Wei" in "Sanguozhi," the "Biography of Wei" was not written by the author Chen Shou during his actual visits to the Korean Peninsula and Japan, but was written based on rumors and reports from people who had visited the Korean Peninsula and Japan, and its authenticity is questionable. He further recommended that "the worldview and political situation of Chen Shou (233-297), the author of the "Records of the Three Kingdoms," be examined not only by reading through all 370,000 characters of the "Records of the Three Kingdoms" (the notes by Pei Songzhi (372-451) are comparable to the text with about 360,000 characters), but also by reading the "Records of the Three Kingdoms" as Chen Shou's You have to be familiar with the Confucian scriptures (keiten) that form the worldview to understand it.".

For the first time in the official history of China, a comprehensive article about the Japanese archipelago has been written. The "Book of the Later Han" Touden is older, but the "Sangokushi" Wajinden was written earlier. In the Kodansha academic library "Wakokuden", "Gohansho" is recorded first.

The book describes the existence of a country in Wa (some say later Japan) at that time, centered on the country of Yamatai (Yamai-Kuni), as well as the existence of countries that did not belong to the queen, with descriptions of their locations, official names, and lifestyles. This book also describes the customs, flora and fauna of the Japanese people of the time, and serves as a historical record of the Japanese archipelago in the 3rd century.

However, it is not necessarily an accurate representation of the situation of the Japanese archipelago at that time, which has been a cause of controversy regarding the Yamataikoku
On the other hand, there are also some researchers such as Okada Hidehiro who cast doubt on the value of the "Weijing Wajinden" as a historical document. Okada stated that there were large discrepancies in the location and mileage and that it lacked credibility..Takaraga Hisao said, "The "Wei zhi wan ren" is not complete, and it cannot be regarded as a contemporaneous historical material because of the lack of total consistency and the long transcription period..Although it is certain that the "Wei biography" predates the "Romance of the Three Kingdoms," there are many errors in the surviving anecdotes. In addition, Yoshihiro Watanabe stated that the "Wei Ji Wa Jinden" contains "many biases (distorted descriptions) due to the internal politics and diplomacy of Cao Wei at the time when Himiko sent her envoy and the world view of the historian.

Editions 
Of the several types of printed books that have survived, the "Hyakushabu-bon" (a shadow print of a Southern Song dynasty book) from the 20th century during the Min-Kuo period is considered the best..The first edition of this book was published in 1959 in Beijing, and is available in Japan. In addition, there is a book with punctuation marks, "Wakoku-den" in Kodansha Science Bunko.

The "Wajinden" is written without paragraphs if you look at the photographic version of the book, but it is divided into six paragraphs in the Chinese-language version and the Kodansha Science Bunko version. In terms of content, it is understood to be divided into three major paragraphs.

Relationship between Japan and Wei

Himiko and Ichiba 
Originally, there was a male king for 70 to 80 years, but there was a prolonged disturbance in the whole country (considered as the so-called "Civil War of Wa"). In the end, the confusion was finally quelled by appointing Himiko, a female, as the king.

Himiko was a demon and confused the people. She was elderly and had no husband. Her younger brother assisted her in the administration of the kingdom. She had 1,000 attendants, but only one man was allowed in the palace to serve food and drink and to take messages. The palace was strictly guarded by a guard of soldiers.

Himiko sent a messenger to Wei through Daifang commandery after the first two years of Kage (238), and was appointed by the emperor as "King Wei." In the 8th year of the beginning of the year (247), Daifang dispatched a scholarship priest, Zhang Masa, in the event of a dispute with Gounuguo. According to the description in "Wajinden," he exchanged messengers with the countries of the Korean Peninsula.

When Himiko died in the 8th year of the reign of Shoshi (247), a mound was built and 100 people were buried there. After that, a male king was established, but the whole country did not accept him, and more than 1,000 people were killed. After the death of Himiko, a 13-year-old Toyo, a female of Himiko's clan or sect, was appointed as king and the country was ruled. Jang Masei, who had been dispatched to Japan earlier, admonished Ichino with a proclamation, and Ichino also sent an envoy to Wei.

Diplomacy with the Wei and Jin Dynasties 

 In June of the second year of the reign of King Jingcheng (238), the Queen sent her husband, Nansungmai, and her second emissary, Urban Uri, to Daifang Commandery to request an audience with the Prince of Heaven..In December, the emperor was pleased and proclaimed the queen as the King of Wei, bestowed a gold seal and purple ribbon, gave her a huge gift including 100 bronze mirrors, and named Nianzhengmai as the General of the Central Plains. In addition to the above, there are also a number of other factors to consider.
 The Emperor Ming of Wei (Cao Rui who was on the bed from December 8, January 1, 3 year of Kage ) Died. Cao Fang became the next emperor.
 In 240, the Grand Governor of Daifang, Gong Zun (弓遵), dispatched a group of geniuses to Japan with an imperial decree and ribbons, temporarily conferred the title of King of Japan, and gave them gifts.
 In the fourth year of the reign of the emperor (243), the queen again sent an envoy to Wei, this time with a group of slaves and cloth. The emperor (the King of Qi) made them the commander-in-chief.
 In 245, the emperor (King of Qi) issued an imperial decree to send a yellow banner to Nanshengmai through Obi County. However, this was not carried out, as the Grand Protector Yumizun was killed in the battle against Han, which followed the battle against Uzushi in the same year.
 In 247, a new Grand Administrator, Wang Qi (王頎), arrived in office. The queen sent a messenger to report on the war against the Gounakukoku. This was not based on the report from Japan in the same year, but on an edict issued in the 6th year of the reign.
 After assuming the queen's throne, Ichiban (it is possible that the queen was already Ichiban at the time of the dispatch in the 8th year of the reign of King Jeongjo) had 20 people, including a goblin, send for the return of Zhang Zheng.

In addition, "Shinkoki" in Nihon Shoki is the first 2 in Tai's first 2 years (an error in the 2nd year of Tai's beginning (266)) in "Shin Kiseki Note" (which does not exist). In October of the year, there is a description that the Queen of Wa contributed by repeating interpreters. In the existing "Book of Jin" Takeshiki, there is an article that Wajin made a tribute in November of the 2nd year of Taisei, and in the four barbarians, Wajin repeated an interpreter at the beginning of Taisei and made a tribute. The queen is considered a tribute because it is (although not written as a queen). It is probable that she made a tribute to the Emperor Jin (Emperor Wu of Jin), who was established on behalf of Wei.

After the Japanese 
After the record of Ichiba's tribute in the mid-3rd century, there would be no record of Japan in Chinese historical books for nearly 150 years until the tribute of King San (one of the five kings of Wa) in the 9th year of Yihee (413) in the 5th century. The Gwanggaeto Stele fills in this gap, stating that in 391 people from Wa crossed the sea to Baekje and Shilla, and that either Goguryeo or Wa had subjugated those nations.

The journey to Yamataikoku and the state of Japan 
According to the "Wei Zhi Wajin Den", the Japanese people relied on the mountainous island as their national euphony, and paid tribute to the continent through the Daifang Commandery that was established by the Han Dynasty near the current Seoul.

As for the route from Obifang County to Japan, the Wei-Shi-Kan biography (Book 30 of Wei, Wusu-Senbei-Toibei biography in the Romance of the Three Kingdoms) describes the location and boundaries of Han and Wa to the south of Obifang County.

Korea is in the south of the belt, east and west to the sea as the limit, the south and Japan. The party can be 4,000 miles. There are three types of Korea, one is called Ma Korea, two is called Tatsu Korea, three is Ben Korea.

Han is located in the south of Obiang County, bordered by the sea on the east and west and by Japan on the south. It covers an area of about 4,000 li. Han is divided into three parts. The first is called Ma-han, the second is called Chin-han, and the third is Ben-han.

The "Han" region occupies the central part of the Korean Peninsula from the east coast to the west coast, while the "Wa" region starts from the south coast.

"Gohansho" Touden (Retsuden 75th) makes the positional relationship of Samhan more concrete.

In the west, there are 54 states in Korea, the north of which is connected with Lelang and the south of which is connected with Japan. In the east of Korea, there are twelve states, the north of which is bordered by Yemaek. Benchen is in the south of Tatsuhan, and there are also twelve kingdoms to the south of it, and it is also bordered by Japan.

Ma-han is in the west and has 54 countries, and its north is in contact with Lelang-gun and its south with Japan. Singhan is located in the east and has 12 countries, and its north is in contact with Maekgung. Benjin is located to the south of Cinnabar and has twelve kingdoms, the south of which also borders on Japan.

It is said that Ma-han is located on the west coast of Han, while Shin-han is located on the north of the east coast, and Ben-chin (辰韓) is located in the south. It is also important to note that there is a large amount of information on the history of the Korean Peninsula.

Country and journey to Yamatai country 
There are various theories about official names.

Rest of the world 
In addition to Gusu Korea, Tsushima, the major kingdoms of Surogoku, Itokoku, Nakoku, Fuya and Touma, and Umataikoku, which are located north of the Queen Country, there are other distant countries whose names we only know.  There is also a record of a disagreement with Himiyukyu, the male king of the Gounakukoku in the south. There are two versions of Nukoku, one saying that it is the same country and the other saying that it is a different country.

Number of ri from Obikata-gun to the Queen Country (Yamataikoku)

State of Wakoku 

Chronology 

In the same way, it is important to note that the article on the presentation of yellow banners to the Nansho rice in 245 was issued in the same year, but was not actually delivered until 247. It is also important to note that the article on the presentation of yellow banners to rice in 245 was issued in the same year, but was not actually delivered until 247. In addition, it is often misunderstood that the reason the Wei envoy came to Japan in 247 was because of the decree of 245, not because of the appeal of the Japanese envoy in 247 (although this may have been the reason for the proclamation).

Yamatai Country Controversy 
If you travel the number of villages and the number of days written in "Wajinden" as they are, you will travel past Japanese archipelago and into the Pacific ocean, no definitive theory has been found for the location of the archipelago and the ratio of the route. There are "Honshu Theory" and "Kyushu Theory" that are influential in the position ratio. There are "continuous theory" and "radiation theory" as influential ones about the ratio of the route (see Yamatai).

The relationship between the "Weijing biography" and the "Later Han Dynasty" biography 
There is a description about Wa in and "Tohoden". The content has something in common with "Wakoku Wakokuden", but articles such as "Wakoku Wakoku Daisuke" whose age is not specified in "Wakoku Wakokuden" in "Gohansho" Wakoku. There is also.

Fan Ye's "Book of the Later Han" and," "Tohoden," contain a description of Japan. The content of the description has some points in common with "Wajinden," but "Go-kansho" Wa-den also contains articles such as "桓霊間倭國大亂" which is not dated in "Wajinden.

Relationship between "Wajinden" and "The Book of Sui" Wakokuden 
In the "Sui Dynasty and Sui Dynasty (618-907)," the Sui Dynasty (618-907), the Sui Dynasty (618-907), the Sui Dynasty (618-907), the Sui Dynasty (618-907), and the Sui Dynasty (618-907). (The Sui Dynasty and the Sui Dynasty, in the Sui Dynasty and the Sui Dynasty, used "俀" for "倭", which was corrected to "倭國" for "Japan". It is located southeast of Baekje and Silla, and depends on mountains and islands in the sea for 3,000 miles by land and water. Its borders are east-west and west-moon lines, and north-south and south-south moon lines, each leading to the sea. The border is east to west in a line of five moons, and north to south in a line of three moons, each leading to the sea. The capital is located in Yama-dui, which is called Yama-dui in the "Wei Zhi" (Wei Zhi). It is located east of Huiyue, close to Huemi, and is 12,000 thousand li away from the border of Lelang and Bifang County. This acknowledges the continuity of the Japanese provinces (Yamataikoku and the Yamato Imperial Court). The Sui Dynasty is comprehensively described in the Book of Sui, referring to the Wei Book, the Wei Book, and the Later Han Book, as well as the Song Book and the Liang Book, and the Sui Dynasty Book is a comprehensive description.

See also 

 Ikikoku
 Ito
 Toyo (Japan)
 Tsushima Province
 Nakoku
 Himiko
 
 Civil War of Wa

Footnotes

References

Bibliography 

 
 
 
 
 
 
 
  
 
 
  
 
 注記：附録に原文・参考原文・参考文献あり.
  の改訳版.

Related Documents

External links 

 
 Yayoi Museum
 History of the founding of Japan

Three Kingdoms
Twenty-Four Histories
Yamatai
History of Japan
Pages with unreviewed translations

Wajinden